Kakolat is the name of a waterfall located in the Nawada district of Bihar, India.

Overview
Kakolat waterfall, situated on the Kakolat hill, is located on the border of Bihar and is 33 km from Nawada and 4 km from Thali Bazar (the last turn leading to Kakolat waterfall). The Kakolat waterfall cascades down from a height of between 150 and 160 feet and forms a natural reservoir at the base of the waterfall. It is located near Govindpur police station and is surrounded by forests.

Kakolat Falls is a tourist spot in Bihar. During festivals held at the waterfall for Vaisakhi or Chait Shankranti, many devotees take a bath in the waterfall. On 30 Dec 2018, CM Nitish Kumar visited Kakolat Falls and announced various projects related to the its development.

Role in Indian mythology

A Treta Yuga king was cursed to become a python and live at Kakolat Falls by a Hindu spiritualist. During their exile, the waterfall was visited by the Pandavas. When visiting, the accursed king got rid of the curse. The king proclaimed any person who bathed in the waterfall would never be reborn as a snake, thus why devotees bathe in Kakolat.

References

Waterfalls of Bihar
Nawada district
Waterfalls of India